Giacinto "Cinto" Sertorelli (1 January 1915 – 28 January 1938) was an Italian alpine skier who competed in the 1936 Winter Olympics.

Biography
Born in  Bormio, Lombardy, in 1936 he finished seventh in the alpine skiing combined event. He died in Garmisch-Partenkirchen during a race, when he fell and crashed into a tree. His brother Stefano was a member of the 1936 Olympic military patrol team and his brother Erminio was a successful cross-country skier.

References

External links

1915 births
1938 deaths
Sportspeople from the Province of Sondrio
Italian male alpine skiers
Olympic alpine skiers of Italy
Alpine skiers at the 1936 Winter Olympics
Skiing deaths
Sport deaths in Germany